The 2021 Men's FIH Hockey Junior World Cup was the 12th edition of the Men's FIH Hockey Junior World Cup, the biennial men's under-21 field hockey world championship organized by the International Hockey Federation. It was held at the Kalinga Stadium in Bhubaneswar, India from 24 November to 5 December 2021.

The hosts India were the defending champions but lost to Germany in the semifinals. Argentina won their second title by defeating Germany in the final.

Qualification
A total of 16 teams qualified for the final tournament. In addition to India, who qualified automatically as hosts, 12 other teams qualified from five separate continental competitions and another 3 won wildcards after withdraws.

Umpires
The following 14 umpires were selected on 23 September 2021 by the FIH:

Dan Barstow (ENG)
Michael Dutrieux (BEL)
Alex Fedenczuk (SCO)
Federico García (URU)
Antonio Ilgrande (ITA)
Deepak Joshi (IND)
Peter Kabaso (KEN)
Ilanggo Kanabathu (MAS)
Hideki Kinoshita (JPN)
Tyler Klenk (CAN)
Eric Koh (MAS)
Sean Rapaport (RSA)
Paul van den Assum (NED)
Paul Walker (ENG)

Squads

Players born on or after 1 January 2000 were eligible to compete in the tournament. Each team had to name a squad of up to 18 players.

Preliminary round
All times are local (UTC+5:30).

Pool A

Pool B

Pool C

Pool D

Classification round

Bracket

Placement finals

Thirteenth to sixteenth place classification

Cross-overs

Fifteenth and sixteenth place

Thirteenth and fourteenth place

Ninth to twelfth place classification

Cross-overs

Eleventh and twelfth place

Ninth and tenth place

Medal round

Bracket

Quarter-finals

Fifth to eighth place classification

Cross-overs

Seventh and eighth place

Fifth and sixth place

First to fourth place classification

Semi-finals

Third and fourth place

Final

Final standings

Awards
The following awards were given at the conclusion of the tournament.

Goalscorers

See also
2022 Women's FIH Hockey Junior World Cup

Notes

References

External links
FIH website

 
Hockey Junior World Cup
Junior World Cup
International field hockey competitions hosted by India
FIH Hockey Junior World Cup
FIH Hockey World Cup
FIH Hockey Junior World Cup
FIH Hockey Junior World Cup
Sport in Bhubaneswar